Sweet Nothing in My Ear is a 2008 American made-for-television drama film directed by Joseph Sargent and is based on a 1998 play of the same name by Stephen Sachs, who also wrote the teleplay. It stars Jeff Daniels and Marlee Matlin as the parents of a Deaf child, played by Noah Valencia, who struggle with deciding to give their child an implant that will allow him to hear again. The film premiered on CBS as a Hallmark Hall of Fame presentation on April 20, 2008.

This was the final film directed by Sargent before his death on December 22, 2014,

With the film Hallmark Channel and producer-director Joseph Sargent revisited deafness with a universal theme contemplating the relationship of a minority group to society at large, 23 years after their previous film on a similar theme, the Emmy-winning Love Is Never Silent (1985).

Daniels studied American Sign Language before filming, in order to portray the language accurately.

Plot
Dan and Laura Miller (Daniels, Matlin) have been married for nine years, are separated, and in a custody dispute over their deaf son, Adam (Valencia). Their close relationship began to change when Adam loses his hearing at the age of four, the condition was initially accepted as Laura is deaf since her youth. Adam turns eight years old and he is injured when Dan is unable to warn him of oncoming danger. Dan begins to explore the idea of cochlear implants.

Flashbacks show how various situations in their lives have been advantageous and unfortunate to be deaf. The effects of deafness on the relationships of the grandparents are explored as one set is deaf and the other hearing. The issue of Deaf Pride and Deaf culture weighs in from the family.

The attorneys and the witnesses at the custody hearing focus on the benefits and disadvantages of cochlear implants. The case is to resume following the weekend. Both parents see that living separately is not helping with the raising of their children and they will make the decision as a family.

Cast
 Marlee Matlin as Laura Miller
 Jeff Daniels as Dan Miller
 Noah Valencia  as Adam Miller
 Rosemary Forsyth as Louise Miller
 Sonya Walger as Joanna Tate 
 Ed Waterstreet as Max
 Phyllis Frelich as Sally
 David Oyelowo  as Leonard Grisham
 Deanne Bray as Dr Walters
 Shoshannah Stern as Valerie Park

Reception
The film was reviewed by Brian Lowry for Variety; the review summary reads, "Hallmark and producer-director Joseph Sargent revisit deafness with a universal theme that contemplates the relationship of a minority group to society at large. Here, the pivotal question involves a choice unavailable to most minorities — whether they would opt out of that status if possible. Buoyed by Marlee Matlin and Jeff Daniels' strong performances, the Hall of Fame's 233rd entry suffers a tepid ending but still gets its thoughtful point across, loud and clear."

See also
 Deaf culture
 List of films featuring the deaf and hard of hearing

References

External links
 
 Sweet Nothing in My Ear at CBS.com
 Sweet Nothing in My Ear at Hallmark.com

2008 television films
2008 films
American Sign Language films
Films about deaf people
2008 drama films
American films based on plays
Hallmark Hall of Fame episodes
Sign language television shows
Films directed by Joseph Sargent
Films scored by Charles Bernstein